Sarcotheca monophylla is a species of plant in the family Oxalidaceae. It is a tree endemic to Peninsular Malaysia.

References

monophylla
Endemic flora of Peninsular Malaysia
Trees of Peninsular Malaysia
Near threatened plants
Taxonomy articles created by Polbot